In the 2010–11 season, USM Alger competed in the Ligue 1 for the 33rd time, as well as the Algerian Cup.  It was their 16th consecutive season in the top flight of Algerian football.

Season summary 

It was decided by the Ligue de Football Professionnel and the Algerian Football Federation to professionalize the Algerian football championship, starting from the 2010–11 season Thus all the Algerian football clubs which until then enjoyed the status of semi-professional club, will acquire the professional appointment this season. the president of the Algerian Football Federation, Mohamed Raouraoua, has been speaking since his inauguration as the federation's president in Professionalism, promising a new way of management based on rigor and seriousness, especially since football has bottomed out in recent seasons, due to the catastrophic management of the clubs which could not go And were lagging behind clubs in neighboring countries that have made extraordinary progress, becoming full-fledged professional clubs, which will enable them to increase their African continent, On August 4, 2010, USM Alger went public in conjunction with the professionalization of the domestic league. Algerian businessman Ali Haddad became the majority share owner after investing 700 million Algeria dinars to buy an 83% ownership in the club to become the first professional club in Algeria. 

On 27 October, Haddad replaced Saïd Allik as president of the club. Allik had been the club's president for the past 18 years. The first season of professional football in Algeria it was difficult for USM Alger and is the worst since the 1999–2000 season, and Noureddine Saadi was removed from his post to be replaced by Frenchman Hervé Renard with a clause in his contract allows him to leave if he is solicited by a national selection. Al-Ittihad suffered a lot and did not achieve any victory for nearly 5 months. and waited until the last round to ensure survival after the victory against USM Annaba.

Squad list
Players and squad numbers last updated on 18 November 2010.Note: Flags indicate national team as has been defined under FIFA eligibility rules. Players may hold more than one non-FIFA nationality.

Competitions

Ligue 1

League table

Results summary

Results by round

Matches

Algerian Cup

Squad information

Playing statistics

Appearances (Apps.) numbers are for appearances in competitive games only including sub appearances
Red card numbers denote:   Numbers in parentheses represent red cards overturned for wrongful dismissal.

Goalscorers
Includes all competitive matches. The list is sorted alphabetically by surname when total goals are equal.

Transfers

In

Out

References

USM Alger seasons
USM Alger